"School Days" (also known as "School Day (Ring! Ring! Goes the Bell)") is a rock-and-roll song written and recorded by Chuck Berry and released by Chess Records as a single in March 1957 and on the LP After School Session two months later (see 1957 in music). It is one of his best-known songs and is often considered a rock-and-roll anthem.

The last verse of the song contains the lyrics "Hail, hail rock and roll / Deliver me from the days of old." Hail! Hail! Rock and Roll became the title of a 1987 concert film and documentary about Berry; the song itself is also commonly mistitled as Hail Hail Rock and Roll. Much of the song's musical arrangement was reused by Berry in 1964 in "No Particular Place to Go". A similar arrangement, though quite different, was also used for "Big Ben".

Recording
Berry recorded the song on January 21, 1957, at Universal Recording Corporation in Chicago, Illinois. The sessions were produced by the Chess brothers, Leonard and Phil.
 Chuck Berry - vocals, guitar
 Johnnie Johnson - piano
 Hubert Sumlin (known for his work with Howlin' Wolf) - guitar
 Willie Dixon - bass
 Fred Below - drums

Charts
Berry's record peaked at number 5 on the Billboard Hot 100 chart (his third highest-ranked pop hit) and hit number one on the R&B Best Sellers chart. It was also his first appearance on the UK Singles Chart, reaching number 24.

Cover versions
A 1959 live version by Eddie Cochran was released in 1999 on the album The Town Hall Party Shows.

A 1957 British cover version by Don Lang and His Frantic Five reached number 26 in the UK.

The song was covered in 1957 by "The Bob Court Skiffle" as "School Day" and released on UK Decca F 10905

The song was covered by Jan & Dean on their 1964 album Dead Man's Curve – The New Girl In School, under the title "School Days". Their version was released on a single by Liberty Records in 1966.

The Knights, a studio project of Gary Usher, covered the song on their only album, Hot Rod High, in 1964.

The song was covered by Phil Ochs played at second concert at Carnegie Hall in 1970.

The song was covered by Australian rock band Daddy Cool on their debut album Daddy Who? Daddy Cool. The album was number 1 in Australia for seven weeks in 1971.

An unofficial version of "School Days" was played at the sound check for a Led Zeppelin concert at Chicago Stadium on July 6, 1973.

New Riders of the Purple Sage performed "School Days" live at the Academy of Music in New York City on November 24, 1973.

The Australian hard rock band AC/DC recorded a version of "School Days" for their second album, T.N.T. It was originally released only in Australia, but in 1997 it was released internationally on Volts, a compilation of songs sung by Bon Scott, as part of the box set Bonfire.

The song was remade by the British rocker Gary Glitter, who recorded it under the title "School Day (Ring! Ring! Goes the Bell)" on his album Glitter in 1972.

The song was covered by the Iron City Houserockers for their first album, Love's So Tough, under the title "School Days (Ring! Ring! Goes the Bell)", but was cut from the final release. The track was released on their compilation album Pumping Iron & Sweating Steel: The Best of the Iron City Houserockers.

The Australian rock-and-roll revival band Ol' 55 recorded a version of "School Days" as an "outro" track on their album Take It Greasy, released in 1976.

"School Days" was covered by the Beach Boys, under the title "School Day (Ring! Ring! Goes the Bell)" on their 1980 album Keepin' the Summer Alive, with Al Jardine on lead vocals. This version includes a verse from the 1907 song of the same name in the intro.

"School Days" was covered and performed by The Rock-afire Explosion in 1981

"School Days" was covered by the blues pianist and vocalist Ann Rabson on her album Struttin' My Stuff in 2000.

Lil Rob remade the song, retitled "Street Dayz", for his album The Album, adding a skit and replacing the school-related lyrics with references to gang life, drugs, and sex.

A version of "School Days" was included on The Simpsons album The Simpsons Sing the Blues, with vocals from Buster Poindexter and the cartoon character Bart Simpson, and featured a lead guitar solo by Joe Walsh.

Elvis Presley's orchestra often played a version of "School Days" in concert in the last years of his life as an instrumental as Elvis introduced the members of his ensemble. Record releases of this performance were often mistitled "Hail Hail Rock and Roll."

References

External links
"School Days" at AllMusic 
Analysis of the song on ReasonToRock.com

Chuck Berry songs
Jan and Dean songs
The Beach Boys songs
AC/DC songs
1957 singles
Chess Records singles
Songs written by Chuck Berry
Eddie Cochran songs
Songs about school
1957 songs